Ħal Tmiem is a suburb of Żejtun, Malta. It has an area of

Name 
Unlike common belief that the town is named "Tmiem"1 due to it being on the outskirts of the much-larger town of Zejtun, the suburb's name is actually derived from "Temim Assant" which is the name of an Arabic individual who lived in the area. Its name then changed through the following:

 “raħal timin” (1498)
 “raħal timil” (1534)
 “raħal Chimin” (1538)
 “racal timin” (1538) 
 “ta’ ħal timin” (1593)

Chapel of St Mary of Ħal Tmin 
This chapel was founded in 1597 by Leonardo Tabone and is dedicated to the Assumption of Mary. It remains active and is used to teach catechism classes and other religions actives and meetings.

Notes 
 1"Tmiem" has the meaning of "End" in the Maltese Language.

References 

Żejtun